Ladislau Mokos (born 9 October 1931) was a Romanian basketball player, born in Oradea, who competed in the 1952 Summer Olympics. He was part of the Romanian basketball team, which was eliminated in the first round of the 1952 tournament. He played both matches.

References

External links
 

1931 births
Possibly living people
Sportspeople from Oradea
Basketball players at the 1952 Summer Olympics
Olympic basketball players of Romania
Romanian men's basketball players
20th-century Romanian people